The following is a list of notable deaths in September 2002.

Entries for each day are listed alphabetically by surname. A typical entry lists information in the following sequence:
 Name, age, country of citizenship at birth, subsequent country of citizenship (if applicable), reason for notability, cause of death (if known), and reference.

September 2002

1
Dale E. Hamilton, 93, American athlete and coach.
Yuji Ichioka, 66, American historian and civil rights activist, cancer.
B. V. Karanth, 72, Indian actor and director.
Peter Ramsden, 68, British rugby league player.
Rodney Taylor, 62, senior officer in the Royal Australian Navy, lung cancer.

2
Leon Campbell, 75, American professional football player (University of Arkansas, Chicago Bears, Pittsburgh Steelers).
Abe Lemons, 79, American college basketball player and coach, complications from Parkinson's disease.
Rodica Ojog-Brașoveanu, 63, Romanian writer, severe lung problems.
Dick Reynolds, 87, Australian rules footballer.
Sir Robert Wilson, 75, British astrophysicist, known for his research in optical and solar plasma spectroscopy.

3
Kenneth Hare, 83, Canadian scientist.
Clinton A. Puckett, 76, United States Marine and recipient of the Navy Cross.
Ted Ross, 68, American actor (The Wiz, Arthur, Police Academy).
W. Clement Stone, 100, American businessman, philanthropist and self-help book author.
Len Wilkinson, 85, British cricketer.
Eugene Allen Wright, 89, American judge (U.S. circuit judge of the U.S. Court of Appeals for the Ninth Circuit).

4
Frankie Albert, 82, American professional football player (Stanford, San Francisco 49ers).
Dave Baker, 65, American professional football player (University of Oklahoma, San Francisco 49ers).
Jerome Biffle, 74, American Olympic long jumper (gold medalist 1952).
Jim Constable, 69, American baseball player (New York/San Francisco Giants, Cleveland Indians, Washington Senators, Milwaukee Braves).
Andrew Forge, 78, American painter, art critic and teacher, Professor of Painting at Yale University.
Vlado Perlemuter, 98, Lithuanian-French pianist and teacher.

5
Robert W. Brooks, 49, American mathematics professor, known for his work in spectral geometry and fractals.
William Cooper, 92, English novelist.
Cliff Gorman, 65, American actor (The Boys in the Band, All That Jazz, Ghost Dog: The Way of the Samurai), Tony winner (1972).
Jackie Kelk, 79, American actor and stand-up comedian, lung infection.
Amon Nikoi, 72, Ghanaian economist and diplomat.
David Todd Wilkinson, 67, American cosmologist, known for his measurements of thermal cosmic background radiation.

6
Michael Argyle, 77, British psychologist, a pioneer of social psychology in Britain.
Roxy Atkins, 90, Canadian track and field athlete (women's 80 metres hurdles at the 1936 Summer Olympics).
Bobby Clancy, 75, Irish singer and musician.
Peter Donaldson, 67, British economist, author, and radio and television broadcaster.
Rafael Druian, 79, American violinist and conductor (New York Philharmonic, Cleveland Orchestra).
Orvan Hess, 96, American physician.
Janet Young, Baroness Young, 75, British politician (Leader of the House of Lords).

7
Gabriel Camps, 75, French historian.
Katrin Cartlidge, 41, English actress (Brookside, Before the Rain, Breaking the Waves), complications from pneumonia and sepsis.
Eugenio Coșeriu, 81,  linguist specialized in Romance languages.
Gene Donaldson, 59, American professional football player (Purdue University, Buffalo Bills).
Michael Elphick, 55, English actor (Boon, EastEnders, Gorky Park, Private Schulz).
John Paul Frank, 84, American lawyer and scholar, helped shape U.S. Supreme Court cases (Brown v. Board of Education, Miranda v. Arizona).
Erma Franklin, 64, American gospel and soul singer ("Piece of My Heart"), older sister of Aretha Franklin.
Uziel Gal, 78, designer of the Uzi submachine gun.
Don Smith, 73, Canadian ice hockey player.

8
Ken Ashton, 76, British journalist and trade union leader (general secretary of the National Union of Journalists).
Carmen Garayalde, 89, Uruguayan exiled political activist and artist.
Marco Siffredi, 23, French snowboarder (last seen on this date).
Laurie Williams, 33, West Indian cricketer, car accident.
Kenneth Yablonski, 68, American attorney.

9
Joan Bartlett, 91, British convert to the Roman Catholic Church.
Tom Bradley, 76, British politician (member of Parliament representing Leicester North East and Leicester East).
Geoffrey Dummer, 92, English electronics engineer, built the first prototype of the integrated circuit.
Gerald W. Johnson, 83, lieutenant general in the US Air Force and WW II flying ace.
Graham Kennedy, 63, New Zealand rugby footballer and coach.
José Luis Massera, 87, Uruguayan mathematician.
Mikail Nersès Sétian, 83, American  bishop.

10
René Cousineau, 72, Canadian politician (member of Parliament representing Gatineau, Quebec).
Sandor Elès, 66, Hungarian actor.
Alexander Farrelly, 78, American politician, governor of the United States Virgin Islands from 1987 to 1995.
David Grene, 89, Irish-American professor of classics.
Kuo Pao Kun, 63, Chinese playwright, theatre director, and arts activist, kidney and liver cancer.
Žarana Papić, 53, Serbian social anthropologist and feminist theorist.

11
Kim Hunter, 79, American actress (A Streetcar Named Desire, Planet of the Apes, The Edge of Night), Oscar winner (1952).
Howard Levi, 85, American mathematician.
Howard T. Odum, 78, American ecologist.
Claude Saint-Cyr, French milliner.
Johnny Unitas, 69, American professional football player and a member of the Pro Football Hall of Fame, cardiovascular renal disease.
Philippe Wamba, 31, American author, journalist and son of a Congolese professor who became a rebel leader.
David Wisniewski, 49, American writer and illustrator of children's books.

12
Lloyd Biggle Jr., 79, American musician and author, leukemia and cancer.
L. J. Foret, 72, American Cajun musician.
Mitsuo Ikeda, 67, Japanese freestyle wrestler and Olympic gold medalist.
Neil Shields, 83, British politician and businessman.

13
Sir Douglas Black, 89, British physician, played a key role in the development of the National Health Service.
Richard Foster, 83, American modernist architect.
George Hills, 84, British journalist and historian.
Charles Herbert Lowe, 82, American biologist.
Sir Brooks Richards, 84, British diplomat and SOE operative.
George Stanley, 95, Canadian historian and public servant.

14
Jim "Bad News" Barnes, 61, American basketball player (gold medal at the 1964 Summer Olympics, Los Angeles Lakers, Boston Celtics), heart problems.
Frederic Bennett, 83, British journalist, barrister politician (member of Parliament for Torbay, Torquay and Reading North).
Donald L. Campbell, 98, American chemical engineer, revolutionized the petroleum industry through fluid catalytic cracking.
Henri Joseph Fenet, 83, French collaborator during World War II.
Michael Greer, 64, American actor, comedian and cabaret performer.
Jim McKee, 55, American baseball player (Pittsburgh Pirates).
LaWanda Page, 81, American actress (Sanford and Son).
Brian Rossiter, Irish victim, blunt force trauma to the head.
Eddie Shokes, 82, American baseball player (Cincinnati Reds).
Paul Williams, 87, African American jazz and blues saxophonist, bandleader, and songwriter ("The Huckle-Buck").

15
Roberto Cavanagh, 87, Argentine Olympic polo player (gold medal winner in polo at the 1936 Summer Olympics).
John Linsley, 77, American physicist.
George Maina, 28, Kenyan Olympic boxer 
Arnolds Mazitis, 89, Latvian artist.
Robert William Pope, 86, British Anglican prelate, Dean of Gibraltar.
Dwight Whylie, 66, Jamaican-Canadian radio announcer, journalist and media manager (BBC, CBC).

16
James Gregory, 90, American actor (Barney Miller, The Manchurian Candidate, The Lawless Years).
Archibald Hall, 78, British criminal.
Karl Huber, 86, Swiss politician, Chancellor.
Rodger Mack, 63, American sculptor, painter, and ceramic artist.
Mary Stott, 95, British journalist and feminist.
Nguyễn Văn Thuận, 74, Vietnamese Roman Catholic prelate.

17
Vasant Bapat, 80, Indian poet.
Eileen Colwell, 98, British author and librarian, one of the founders of the children's library movement.
Jack Ferguson, 78, Australian politician (Deputy Premier of New South Wales), mesothelioma.
Denys Fisher, 84, British inventor of the Spirograph.
James Macdonald, 83, Scottish-born Australian ornithologist.
Dodo Marmarosa, 76, American jazz pianist, composer, and arranger.
André Rousseau, 91, Canadian entrepreneur and politician.
Mollie Wilmot, 79, American philanthropist and socialite, rose to celebrity when a freighter ran aground on her beachfront.
Mun Charn Wong, 84, American business executive (Transamerica Corporation).

18
Andreas Burnier, 71, Dutch writer, focus on homosexuality, transsexuality and discrimination.
Bob Hayes, 59, American football player Dallas Cowboys and a member of the Pro Football Hall of Fame.
Mauro Ramos, 72, Brazilian football player, intestinal cancer.
Margita Stefanović, 43, Serbian musician, complications from HIV.
Siobhán Vernon, 70, Irish mathematician.

19
John Arundel, 74, Canadian professional ice hockey player (Toronto Maple Leafs).
Roy Fowler, 82, Australian Paralympic competitor.
Robert Guéï, 61, military ruler of the Ivory Coast, murdered along with his family.
Rose Doudou Guéï, wife of Robert Guéï, murdered along with her family.
Cosmo Nevill, 95, British Army officer.
Tatyana Velikanova, 70, Soviet dissident and mathematician.

20
Les Auge, 49, American professional ice hockey player (Colorado Rockies).
Sergei Bodrov Jr., 30, Russian movie star, Kolka-Karmadon rock ice slide.
Necdet Kent, 91, Turkish diplomat and humanitarian.
Joan Littlewood, 87, English theatre director.
Bob Wallace, 53, American computer scientist, helped invent "shareware" software marketing.

21
Henry Pybus Bell-Irving, 89, Canadian World War II commander and Lieutenant Governor of British Columbia.
Nils Bohlin, 82, Swedish mechanical engineer, invented the three-point car safety belt.
Angelo Buono, Jr., 67, American serial killer, kidnapper and rapist (the "Hillside Strangler").
Robert L. Forward, 70, American physicist and science fiction author, founded Tethers Unlimited to manufacture tethers for NASA.
Robert White, 81, American sculptor, professor and poet.

22
Don Carlsen, 75, American baseball player (Chicago Cubs, Pittsburgh Pirates).
Jan de Hartog, 88, Dutch novelist and playwright.
Joseph Nathan Kane, 103, American historian and author.
Anthony Milner, 77, British musician.
William Rosenberg, 86, American entrepreneur, bladder cancer.

23
James Scarlett, 8th Baron Abinger, 87, British peer.
Vernon Corea, 75, Sri Lankan-born British radio broadcaster.
George Georges, 82, Australian politician.
Odd Chr. Gøthe, 82, Norwegian civil servant and politician.
Eduard Gufeld, 66, Soviet/Russian International Grandmaster of chess and chess author.
Nangolo Ithete, 61, Namibian politician.
Jule Rivlin, 85, American basketball player and coach.
John Baptist Wu, 77, Hong Kong fifth Catholic bishop, member of the College of Cardinals, first Hong Kong cardinal.
James G. Zimmerly, 61, American physician and lawyer, Chief of Legal Medicine at AFIP, co-discovered the vaccine for meningitis.

24
Hobbs Adams, 99, American football player and coach (USC, Kansas State).
Tetsuya Ayukawa, 83, Japanese literary critic and novelist.
Leon Hart, 73, American football player.
Tim Rose, 62, American singer and songwriter, heart attack.
Ludwig Warnemünde, 85, German long-distance runner (men's marathon at the 1952 Summer Olympics).
Mike Webster, 50, American football player (Pittsburgh Steelers) and a member of the Pro Football Hall of Fame, heart attack.
George Wilson, 86, British cricketer.

25
Bailey Aldrich, 95, American judge (United States circuit judge of the United States Court of Appeals for the First Circuit).
Robert Anthony Buell, 62, American serial killer, execution by lethal injection.
Ray Hayworth, 98, American baseball player (Detroit Tigers, Brooklyn Dodgers, New York Giants, St. Louis Browns).
Roman Pucinski, 83, American Democratic politician.
Arnold Ross, 96, American mathematician.
Naeem Siddiqui, 86, Pakistani Islamic scholar, writer and politician.

26
Marem Arapkhanova, 39, Ingush school teacher and heroine, shot.
Ricardo Calvo, 58, Spanish chess International Master, doctor, chess historian, author and reporter.
Willie Davies, 86, Welsh rugby player.
Zakaria Erzinçlioğlu, 50, British forensic entomologist, used his expertise in insect biology to solve more than 200 murders.
Al Kvasnak, 81, American baseball player (Washington Senators).
Thomas S. Smith, 84, American politician, member of the New Jersey General Assembly.
Zerach Warhaftig, 96, Israeli politician, lawyer and rabbi, helped draft and signed Israel's Declaration of Independence.

27
Lidia Chmielnicka-Żmuda, 63, Polish volleyball player (bronze medal in women's volleyball at the 1968 Summer Olympics).
Jo-Anne L. Coe, 69, American political staffer, longtime aide to Bob Dole and the first woman to serve as Secretary of the United States Senate.
Wally Dreyer, 79, American professional football player (Chicago Bears, Green Bay Packers) and college football coach.
Charles Henri Ford, 94, American poet, novelist, artist, editor and filmmaker.
David Granger, 99, American bobsledder.
Bill Pearson, 80, New Zealand writer.
Glen Rounds, 96, American author and illustrator.

28
Alicia Barrié, 86, Chilean actress.
Whitney Blake, 76, American actress (Hazel), director and producer (One Day at a Time).
Jack Burghardt, 73, Canadian television news broadcaster, politician and a member of Parliament (House of Commons representing London West, Ontario).
John Cannady, 79, American professional football player (Indiana University, New York Giants).
Patsy Mink, 74, American lawyer and politician, viral pneumonia.
Harvey Silbert, 90, American entertainment lawyer, casino executive and philanthropist.

29
Bob Cobbing, 82, British poet, a major exponent of concrete, visual and sound poetry in Britain.
Ine ter Laak-Spijk, 71, Dutch short and middle distance runner.
Mickey Newbury, 62, American songwriter and recording artist, emphysema.
Giuliana Tesoro, 81, American organic chemist.

30
Robert Battersby, 77, British businessman and politician, member of the European Parliament representing Humberside.
Len Casanova, 97, American college football coach and athletic director, coached Oregon Ducks from 1951 to 1966.
Ron Duhamel, 64, Canadian politician (member of Parliament representing Saint Boniface, Manitoba, Senator for Manitoba).
Arthur Hazlerigg, 2nd Baron Hazlerigg, 92, British cricketer and soldier.
Ellis Larkins, 79, American jazz pianist, pneumonia.
Eddie McGah, 81, American baseball player (Boston Red Sox).
Meinhard Michael Moser, 78, Swiss mycologist.
Ewart Oakeshott, 86, British illustrator.
Sir Jock Taylor, 78, British diplomat.

References 

2002-09
09